Greg Smallman (born 19 June 1947 in Cronulla, Australia) is the first internationally successful non-traditional Australian guitar-maker. He is known worldwide for his innovative guitar designs Although his guitars are in outward appearance similar to a traditional Spanish classical guitar, there are numerous innovative differences.

Description 
Among the differences from the classical Spanish guitar is the use of a high, arched and carved back, which is considerably thicker and heavier than for a conventional guitar.  The back is made of Madagascar rosewood, while the top is always made of western red cedar. The light weight of the top combined with Smallman's unique system of bracing makes the guitar very responsive to input with a full rounded sound (not thin). The top of Smallman guitars is braced using a "lattice" framework composed of balsa wood and carbon fibre.  By contrast, traditional classical guitars use struts made of cedar or spruce arranged in a "fan" shape.

The world-renowned classical guitarists John Williams, Milos Karadaglic, Xuefei Yang and many others use Greg Smallman guitars.

In 1999 the Greg Smallman label changed to Greg Smallman & Sons Damon & Kym. Based for many years in Glen Innes, New South Wales, in 2002 the Smallmans briefly relocated to the Mornington Peninsula outside Melbourne.  The Greg Smallman and Sons workshop is now located near Esperance, Western Australia. They did not have a website till 2012.

Greg Smallman is admired for the open way in which he shares his ideas.  He does not hide them from fellow luthiers, nor has he patented them. A large number of luthiers worldwide have incorporated Smallman's design innovations into their own guitar designs.

Quotes

Gallery

See also

Classical guitar making

References

External links
Official site
 Name's Greg, not Jose - Guitar Maker Greg Smallman Interview with Greg Smallman, John Williams and Craig Ogden (28 November 2009; Robyn Johnston and David Le May; ABC Radio, IntoTheMusic) audio interview
  John Williams; Australian Guitar Journal Interview

Australian luthiers
Classical guitar makers
Living people
1947 births
Businesspeople from Sydney